The 24th Young Artist Awards ceremony, presented by the Young Artist Association, honored excellence of young performers under the age of 21 in the fields of film, television, theater, music, and radio for the year 2002, and took place on March 29, 2003 at the Sportsmen's Lodge in Studio City, California.

Established in 1978 by long-standing Hollywood Foreign Press Association member, Maureen Dragone, the Young Artist Association was the first organization to establish an awards ceremony specifically set to recognize and award the contributions of performers under the age of 21 in the fields of film, television, theater and music.

Categories
★ Bold indicates the winner in each category.

Best Performance in a Feature Film

Best Performance in a Feature Film - Leading Young Actor
★ Tyler Hoechlin - Road to Perdition - DreamWorks/20th Century Fox
Jamie Bell - Nicholas Nickleby - MGM/UA
Rory Culkin - Signs - Buena Vista
Nicholas Hoult - About A Boy - Universal/Studio Canal
Lil' Bow Wow - Like Mike - 20th Century Fox
Matthew O'Leary - Frailty - Lions Gate
Mark Rendall - Touching Wild Horses - Animal Tales Productions

Best Performance in a Feature Film - Leading Young Actress
★ Alexa Vega - Spy Kids 2: The Island of Lost Dreams - Buena Vista
Amanda Bynes - Big Fat Liar - Universal Pictures
America Ferrera - Real Women Have Curves - Newmarket Films/HBO Films
Kristen Stewart - Panic Room - Columbia Pictures
Evan Rachel Wood - Little Secrets - Columbia Tristar/Samuel Goldwyn

Best Performance in a Feature Film - Supporting Young Actor
★ Marc Donato - White Oleander - Warner Brothers
Liam Aiken - Road To Perdition - DreamWorks/20th Century Fox
Emile Hirsch - The Emperor's Club - Universal Pictures
Eric Lloyd - The Santa Clause 2 - Walt Disney Pictures
Daniel Logan - Star Wars: Episode II – Attack of the Clones - 20th Century Fox
Andrew Sandler - Minority Report - 20th Century Fox
Dylan Smith - One Hour Photo - Fox Searchlight Pictures

Best Performance in a Feature Film - Supporting Young Actress
★ Eva Amurri - The Banger Sisters - Fox Searchlight Pictures
Agnes Bruckner - Murder By Numbers - Warner Brothers
Chea Courtney - Dragonfly - HBO Films
Everlyn Sampi - Rabbit-Proof Fence - Miramax
Erin Sanders - Never Never - Independent

Best Performance in a Feature Film - Young Actor Age Ten or Younger
★ Tyler Patrick Jones - Red Dragon - Universal Pictures
Angus T. Jones - The Rookie - Walt Disney Pictures
Dominic Scott Kay - Minority Report - 20th Century Fox
Malcolm David Kelley - Antwone Fisher - Fox Searchlight Pictures
Trung Hieu Nguyen - Green Dragon - Columbia Tristar

Best Performance in a Feature Film - Young Actress Age Ten or Younger
★ Caitlin EJ Meyer - Little Secrets - Columbia Tristar/Samuel Goldwyn
Abigail Breslin - Signs - Buena Vista
Emily Osment - Spy Kids 2: The Island of Lost Dreams - Buena Vista
Tianna Sansbury - Rabbit-Proof Fence - Miramax
Sophie Vavasseur - Evelyn - MGM/UA

Best Performance in a TV Movie, Miniseries or Special

Best Performance In a TV Movie, Miniseries or Special - Leading Young Actor
★ Jeremy Sumpter - Just A Dream - Showtime
Jon Foster - Murder in Greenwich - USA Network
Jake Goldsbie - The Red Sneakers - Showtime
Tyler Hynes - Tagged: The Jonathan Wamback Story - CTV
Max Morrow - The Christmas Shoes - CBS
Josh Zuckerman - I Was A Teenage Faust - Showtime

Best Performance in a TV Movie, Miniseries or Special - Leading Young Actress
★ Clara Bryant - Tru Confessions - Disney Channel
Kimberly J. Brown - My Sister's Keeper - CBS
Dakota Fanning - Taken - Sci-Fi Channel
Jodelle Micah Ferland - The Christmas Child - CMT
Maggie Grace - Murder in Greenwich - USA Network
Sabrina Wiener - Gotta Kick It Up! - Disney Channel

Best Performance in a TV Movie, Miniseries or Special - Supporting Young Actor
★ Ryan Merriman - Taken - Sci-Fi Channel
Brandon Hammond - Our America - Showtime
Daniel Magder - Mom's On Strike - ABC
Sean Marquette - Hidden Hills - NBC
Roderick Pannell - Our America - Showtime
Anton Yelchin - Taken - Sci-Fi Channel

Best Performance in a TV Movie, Miniseries or Special - Supporting Young Actress
★ Hallee Hirsh - My Sister's Keeper - CBS
Jenna Boyd - Mary Christmas - PAX
Holliston Coleman - Miss Lettie and Me - TNT
Lindsay Felton - Anna's Dream - PAX
Hannah Lochner - The Interrogation of Michael Crowe - Court TV

Best Performance in a TV Series

Best Performance in A TV Series (Comedy or Drama) - Leading Young Actor
★ Gregory Smith - Everwood - WB
Jake Epstein - Degrassi: The Next Generation - CTV
Jonathan Malen - Screech Owls - YTV
Frankie Muniz - Malcolm in the Middle - Fox TV
Pablo Santos - Greetings from Tucson - WB
Martin Spanjers - 8 Simple Rules - ABC
Kyle Sullivan - All That - Nickelodeon

Best Performance in a TV Series (Comedy or Drama) - Leading Young Actress
★ Masiela Lusha - The George Lopez Show - ABC
Kaley Cuoco - 8 Simple Rules - ABC
Lisa Foiles - All That - Nickelodeon
Christel Khalil - The Young and the Restless - CBS
Renee Olstead - Still Standing - CBS
Scarlett Pomers - Reba - WB
Shadia Simmons - Strange Days at Blake Holsey High - NBC

Best Performance in a TV Series (Comedy or Drama) - Supporting Young Actor
★ Steven Anthony Lawrence - Even Stevens - Disney Channel
Taylor Abrahamse - Doc - PAX
Justin Berfield - Malcolm in the Middle - Fox TV
Hector Escalante - American Family - PBS
Mitch Holleman - Reba - WB
Aaron Meeks - Soul Food - Showtime
Max Morrow - Monk - ABC
Jake Thomas - Lizzie McGuire - Disney Channel

Best Performance in a TV Series (Comedy or Drama) - Supporting Young Actress
★ Emily Hart - Sabrina the Teenage Witch - WB
Katie Boland - The Zack Files - Fox Family
Nicole Dicker - Screech Owls - YTV
Lauren Frost - Even Stevens - Disney Channel
Sara Paxton - Greetings from Tucson - WB
Gigi Sumpter - Strong Medicine - Lifetime
Emma Taylor-Isherwood - Strange Days at Blake Holsey High - NBC

Best Performance in a TV Series (Comedy or Drama) - Young Actor Age Ten or Younger
★ Dylan Cash - General Hospital - ABC
Patrick Allen Dorn - The Bold and the Beautiful - CBS
Luis Armand Garcia - The George Lopez Show - ABC
Demetrius Joyette - Doc - PAX TV
Austin Majors - N.Y.P.D. Blue - ABC
Charlie Stewart - Life with Bonnie - ABC

Best Performance in a TV Series (Comedy or Drama) - Young Actress Age Ten or Younger
★ Sasha Pieterse - Family Affair - WB
Kristen Alderson - One Life to Live - ABC
Taylor Atelian - According to Jim - ABC
Vivien Cardone - Everwood - WB
Dee Dee Davis - The Bernie Mac Show - FOX
Karle Warren - Judging Amy - CBS

Best Performance in a TV Drama Series - Guest Starring Young Actor
★ Alex Black - Charmed - WB
Seth Adkins - CSI: Miami - CBS
Raja Fenske - CSI: Miami - CBS
Jason Fuchs - Law & Order: Special Victims Unit - NBC
David Henrie - Without a Trace - CBS
Myles Jeffrey - Touched by an Angel - CBS
Cody McMains - Everwood - WB
Kyle Saunders - Adventure Inc. - WB

Best Performance in a TV Drama Series - Guest Starring Young Actress
★ Sara Paxton - CSI: Crime Scene Investigation - CBS
Ashley Edner - Judging Amy CBS
Jamie Lauren - The Practice - ABC
Joy Lauren - The Division - Lifetime
Barbara Mamabolo - The Zack Files - Fox Family
Melissa Mitchell - New Unsolved Mysteries - Lifetime
Kay Panabaker - ER - NBC

Best Performance in a TV Comedy Series - Guest Starring Young Actor
★ Christopher Massey - The Parkers - UPN
Robert Clark - Strange Days at Blake Holsey High - NBC
Bobby Edner - Do Over - WB
Steven Anthony Lawrence - Frasier - NBC
Miles Marisco - Malcolm in the Middle - FOX

Best Performance in a TV Comedy Series - Guest Starring Young Actress
★ Amy Castle - Lizzie McGuire - Disney Channel
Chelsea Brummer - What I Like About You - WB
Lauren Storm - Malcolm in the Middle - FOX
Marina Malota - My Wife and Kids - ABC
Brenda Song - The Bernie Mac Show - FOX

Best Performance in a TV Comedy or Drama Series - Guest Starring Young Actor Age Ten or Younger
★ Gavin Fink - The X-Files - FOX
Brett Buford - Everybody Loves Raymond - CBS
Tyler Patrick Jones - Judging Amy - CBS
Bobby Preston - Family Law - CBS

Best Performance in a TV Comedy or Drama Series - Guest Starring Young Actress Age Ten or Younger
★ Jessica Sara - My Wife and Kids - ABC
Alexandra Hart Gilliams - Sabrina the Teenage Witch - WB
Samantha Goldstein - Charmed - WB
Alexandra Lee - Scrubs - NBC
Abigail Mavity - Haunted - UPN
Liliana Mumy - My Wife and Kids - ABC

Best Ensemble in a TV Series (Comedy or Drama)
★ Malcolm in the Middle - Fox
Frankie Muniz, Justin Berfield, Erik Per Sullivan, Kyle Sullivan, Craig Lamar Traylor
American Dreams - NBC
Ethan Dampf, Vanessa Lengies, Sarah Ramos, Brittany Snow
Degrassi: The Next Generation - CTV/Epitome Pictures
Sarah Barrable-Tishauer, Daniel Clark, Lauren Collins, Ryan Cooley, Jake Epstein, Stacey Farber, Jake Goldsbie, Aubrey Graham, Shane Kippel, Andrea Lewis, Miriam McDonald, Melissa McIntyre, Adamo Ruggiero, Christina Schmidt, Cassie Steele
Family Affair - WB
Caitlin Wachs, Jimmy "Jax" Pinchak, Sasha Pieterse
Lizzie McGuire - Disney Channel
Hilary Duff, Lalaine, Jake Thomas, Adam Lamberg
My Wife and Kids - ABC
Parker McKenna Posey, Jennifer Nicole Freeman, George O. Gore II

Best Performance in a Voice-Over Role

Best Performance in a Voice-Over Role
★ Thomas Dekker - The Land Before Time IX: Journey to Big Water - Universal
Spencer Breslin - Return to Never Land - Disney
Haley Joel Osment - The Hunchback of Notre Dame II - Disney
Shawn Pyfrom - Stanley - Disney

Best Performance in a Voice-Over Role - Age Ten or Younger
★ Daveigh Chase - Lilo & Stitch - Disney
Austin Majors - Treasure Planet - Disney
Andrew McDonough - Return to Never Land - Disney

Best Performance in a Commercial

Best Performance in a Commercial
★ Christian Roberts - 7 Up
Cayden Boyd - McDonald's
Dylan Cash - Fujifilm
Jillian Clare - Children's Tylenol
Jenna Morrison - Hallmark Permanent Wave

Best Family Entertainment

Best Family Television Movie or Special
★ ''My Sister's Keeper - CBSThe Christmas Shoes  CBS
Gotta Kick It Up! - Disney Channel
Just a Dream - Showtime
Miss Lettie and Me - TNT
The Red Sneakers - Showtime

Best Family Television Series (Comedy or Drama)
★ The George Lopez Show - ABCThe Bernie Mac Show - FOX
Everwood - WB
Family Affair - WB
Lizzie McGuire - Disney Channel
My Wife and Kids - ABC

Best Family Feature Film - Animation
★ Spirit: Stallion of the Cimarron - DreamWorksIce Age - 20th Century Fox
Lilo & Stitch - Walt Disney
The Princess and the Pea - Visiplex Family Entertainment
Spirited Away - Walt Disney
The Wild Thornberrys Movie - Paramount Pictures

Best Family Feature Film - Comedy
★ The Crocodile Hunter: Collision Course - MGM/UABig Fat Liar - Universal
Like Mike - 20th Century Fox
Little Secrets - Columbia Tristar/Samuel Goldwyn
Maid in Manhattan - Columbia
My Big Fat Greek Wedding - IFC Films

Best Family Feature Film - Drama
★ The Lord of the Rings: The Two Towers - New Line CinemaAntwone Fisher - Fox Searchlight
The Emperor's Club - Universal
Evelyn - MGM/UA
Nicholas Nickleby - MGM/UA
The Rookie - Walt Disney

Best Family Feature Film - Fantasy
★ Star Trek: Nemesis - ParamountSigns - Buena Vista
Spider-Man - Columbia Tristar
Spy Kids 2: The Island of Lost Dreams - Miramax
Star Wars: Episode II – Attack of the Clones - 20th Century Fox
Stuart Little 2 - Sony Pictures Entertainment

Special awards
Best Young Performers in International Film
★ Yoo Seung-ho - The Way Home - Paramount Classics (South Korea)★ Natalie Bjork - Alla älskar Alice (Everyone Loves Alice) - Nordisk Films (Sweden)Best Young Ensemble in International Film
★ Kamchatka - Patagonik Film Group - Tomas Fonzi, Matias Del Pozo, Milton De La Canal (Argentina)Best International Film
★ Zmeg (The Kite) – (Russia)Best Young International Performer
★ Declan Galbraith - Declan - Xenex Music Group/Liberty EMI Records UK (United Kingdom)Best Young Performers in a Theatre Production
★ Adam Wylie - For his role as "Jack" in the 2002 Broadway production of Into The Woods.★ Tierra Abbott - For her role as the blind Helen Keller in the Curtis Theater of Brea, California production of The Miracle Worker.Best Young Performer in a Radio Advertisement
★ Mackenzie Hannigan - For his portrayal of "Bobby Saunders", the "Get Smart" spokes-kid for "Smart & Final".Young Artist Foundation Scholarship Award
★ Joseph AaronFormer Child Star Life Achievement Award
★ Danny Bonaduce - For his role as "Danny Partridge" in the TV series The Partridge Family'' (1970–1974).

References

External links
Official site

Young Artist Awards ceremonies
2002 film awards
2002 television awards
2003 in California
2003 in American cinema
2003 in American television